Ryan Agar and Adam Feeney were the Traralgon Champions from 2013, but he did not defend their title, while Brydan Klein and Dane Propoggia were the defending Traralgon Champion, having won the first of two challengers held in this place in 2014, and successfully defended their title defeating Marcus Daniell and Artem Sitak in the final, 7–6(8–6), 3–6, [10–6].

Seeds

Draw

References
 Main draw

2014 Doubles
2014 in Australian tennis
2014 ATP World Tour